Qualifying Round:
Guatemala received a bye and advanced to the Championship directly. The remaining 16 teams were paired up to play knockout matches on a home-and-away basis. The winners would advance to the CONCACAF Championship.

Results

El Salvador advanced.

Jamaica withdrew, so Canada qualified automatically.

United States advanced.

Barbados withdrew, so Costa Rica qualified automatically.

Honduras advanced.

Grenada withdrew, so Trinidad and Tobago qualified automatically.

Haiti advanced.

Suriname qualified.

Goalscorers

3 goals

 Maxime Auguste
 José Roberto Figueroa

2 goals

 Mauricio Alfaro
 Ever Hernández
 José María Rivas
 Ade Coker

1 goal

 Everton Gonzalves
 Elvis Roberts
 Dagoberto Lopez Medrano
 Luis Ramírez Zapata
 Terrence Archer
 Keslin Thomas
 Edward Vorbe
 Eduardo Laing
 Jacob Edwards
 Umberto Klinker
 Angelo DiBernardo
 Erhardt Kapp

References

CONCACAF Gold Cup qualification
qualification
qualification